Tam Breckenridge (born 1 October 1958) is an American female former rugby union player. They were crowned champions after defeating  19–6 in the final. Breckenridge and her 1991 World Cup teammates were inducted into the United States Rugby Hall of Fame in 2017.

References

1958 births
Living people
United States women's international rugby union players
American female rugby union players
Female rugby union players
21st-century American women